The Nancao railway station is a railway station on Zhengzhou–Xinzheng Airport Intercity Railway in Zhengzhou, Henan, China.

Station layout
The station is an elevated station with 2 side platforms and 4 tracks. The platforms are on the upper level while the station concourse and the waiting area are on the ground level.

References

Railway stations in Henan
Railway stations in Zhengzhou
Stations on the Zhengzhou–Xinzheng Airport Intercity Railway
Railway stations in China opened in 2015